Charles Lawes (9 December 1899 – 23 October 1980) was an Australian cricketer. He played one first-class match for New South Wales in 1924/25.

See also
 List of New South Wales representative cricketers

References

External links
 

1899 births
1980 deaths
Australian cricketers
New South Wales cricketers
People from the Orana (New South Wales)
Cricketers from New South Wales